In number theory, the Padovan sequence is the sequence of integers P(n) defined by the initial values

and the recurrence relation

The first few values of P(n) are

1, 1, 1, 2, 2, 3, 4, 5, 7, 9, 12, 16, 21, 28, 37, 49, 65, 86, 114, 151, 200, 265, ... 

A Padovan prime is a Padovan number that is prime. The first Padovan primes are:

2, 3, 5, 7, 37, 151, 3329, 23833, 13091204281, 3093215881333057, 1363005552434666078217421284621279933627102780881053358473, 1558877695141608507751098941899265975115403618621811951868598809164180630185566719, ... .

The Padovan sequence is named after Richard Padovan who attributed its discovery to Dutch architect Hans van der Laan in his 1994 essay Dom. Hans van der Laan : Modern Primitive. The sequence was described by Ian Stewart in his Scientific American column Mathematical Recreations in June 1996. He also writes about it in one of his books, "Math Hysteria: Fun Games With Mathematics".

The above definition is the one given by Ian Stewart and by MathWorld. Other sources may start the sequence at a different place, in which case some of the identities in this article must be adjusted with appropriate offsets.

Recurrence relations
In the spiral, each triangle shares a side with two others giving a visual proof that 
the Padovan sequence also satisfies the recurrence relation

Starting from this, the defining recurrence and other recurrences as they are discovered,
one can create an infinite number of further recurrences by repeatedly replacing  by 

The Perrin sequence satisfies the same recurrence relations as the Padovan sequence, although it has different initial values.

The Perrin sequence can be obtained from the Padovan sequence by the 
following formula:

Extension to negative parameters
As with any sequence defined by a recurrence relation, Padovan numbers P(m) for m<0 can be defined by rewriting the recurrence relation as

Starting with m = −1 and working backwards, we extend P(m) to negative indices:

{| class="wikitable" style="text-align:right"
|-
| P−20
| P−19
| P−18
| P−17
| P−16 
| P−15
| P−14
| P−13
| P−12
| P−11
| P−10
| P−9
| P−8
| P−7
| P−6
| P−5
| P−4
| P−3
| P−2
| P−1
| P0
| P1
| P2
|-
| 7
| −7
| 4
| 0
| −3
| 4
| −3
| 1
| 1
| −2
| 2
| −1
| 0
| 1
| −1
| 1
| 0
| 0
| 1
| 0
| 1
| 1
| 1
|-
|}

Sums of terms
The sum of the first n terms in the Padovan sequence is 2 less than P(n + 5), i.e.

Sums of alternate terms, sums of every third term and sums of every fifth term are also related to other terms in the sequence:

 

 

 

Sums involving products of terms in the Padovan sequence satisfy the following identities:

Other identities
The Padovan sequence also satisfies the identity

The Padovan sequence is related to sums of binomial coefficients by the following identity:

For example, for k = 12, the values for the pair (m, n) with 2m + n = 12 which give non-zero binomial coefficients are (6, 0), (5, 2) and (4, 4), and:

Binet-like formula

The Padovan sequence numbers can be written in terms of powers of the roots of the equation

This equation has 3 roots; one real root p (known as the plastic number) and two complex conjugate roots q and r. Given these three roots, the Padovan sequence can be expressed by a formula involving p, q and r :

where a, b and c are constants.

Since the absolute values of the complex roots q and r are both less than 1 (and hence p is a Pisot–Vijayaraghavan number), the powers of these roots approach 0 for large n, and  tends to zero.

Indeed,  is the value of constant a above, while b and c are obtained by replacing p with q and r, respectively.

The ratio of successive terms in the Padovan sequence approaches p, which has a value of approximately 1.324718. This constant bears the same relationship to the Padovan sequence and the Perrin sequence as the golden ratio does to the Fibonacci sequence.

Combinatorial interpretations
 P(n) is the number of ways of writing n + 2 as an ordered sum in which each term is either 2 or 3 (i.e. the number of compositions of n + 2 in which each term is either 2 or 3). For example, P(6) = 4, and there are 4 ways to write 8 as an ordered sum of 2s and 3s:

2 + 2 + 2 + 2  ;  2 + 3 + 3  ;  3 + 2 + 3  ;  3 + 3 + 2

 The number of ways of writing n as an ordered sum in which no term is 2 is P(2n − 2). For example, P(6) = 4, and there are 4 ways to write 4 as an ordered sum in which no term is 2:

4  ;  1 + 3  ;  3 + 1  ;  1 + 1 + 1 + 1

 The number of ways of writing n as a palindromic ordered sum in which no term is 2 is P(n). For example, P(6) = 4, and there are 4 ways to write 6 as a palindromic ordered sum in which no term is 2:

6  ;  3 + 3  ;  1 + 4 + 1  ;  1 + 1 + 1 + 1 + 1 + 1

 The number of ways of writing n as an ordered sum in which each term is odd and greater than 1 is equal to P(n − 5). For example, P(6) = 4, and there are 4 ways to write 11 as an ordered sum in which each term is odd and greater than 1:

11 ; 5 + 3 + 3 ; 3 + 5 + 3 ; 3 + 3 + 5

 The number of ways of writing n as an ordered sum in which each term is congruent to 2 mod 3 is equal to P(n − 4). For example, P(6) = 4, and there are 4 ways to write 10 as an ordered sum in which each term is congruent to 2 mod 3:

8 + 2  ;  2 + 8  ;  5 + 5  ;  2 + 2 + 2 + 2 + 2

Generating function
The generating function of the Padovan sequence is

This can be used to prove identities involving products of the Padovan sequence with geometric terms, such as:

Generalizations 

In a similar way to the Fibonacci numbers that can be generalized to a set of polynomials
called the Fibonacci polynomials, the Padovan sequence numbers can be generalized to
yield the Padovan polynomials.

Padovan L-system 

If we define the following simple grammar:

     variables :   A  B  C
     constants :   none
     start     :   A
     rules     :   (A → B), (B → C), (C → AB)

then this Lindenmayer system or L-system produces the following sequence of strings:

     n = 0 : A
     n = 1 : B
     n = 2 : C
     n = 3 : AB
     n = 4 : BC
     n = 5 : CAB
     n = 6 : ABBC
     n = 7 : BCCAB 
     n = 8 : CABABBC

and if we count the length of each string, we obtain the Padovan numbers:

    1, 1, 1, 2, 2, 3, 4, 5, ...

Also, if you count the number of As, Bs and Cs in each string, then for the nth
string, you have P(n − 5) As, P(n − 3) Bs and P(n − 4) Cs.  The count of BB pairs
and CC pairs are also Padovan numbers.

Cuboid spiral 

A spiral can be formed based on connecting the corners of a set of 3-dimensional cuboids.
This is the Padovan cuboid spiral. Successive sides of this spiral have lengths that are
the Padovan numbers multiplied by the square root of 2.

Pascal's triangle 
Erv Wilson in his paper The Scales of Mt. Meru observed certain diagonals in Pascal's triangle (see diagram) and drew them on paper in 1993. The Padovan numbers were discovered in 1994. Paul Barry (2004) showed that these diagonals generate the Padovan sequence by summing the diagonal numbers.

References

 Ian Stewart, A Guide to Computer Dating (Feedback), Scientific American, Vol. 275, No. 5, November 1996, Pg. 118.

External links

A Padovan sequence calculator

Integer sequences
Recurrence relations